Uzunköprü railway station is a railway station on the Istanbul-Pythio railway. Located just north of Uzunköprü, the station is in the village of Demirtaş along the D.550 state highway. It is the last serviceable station on the railway before it crosses over into Greece. Prior to the Greek debt crisis, the Friendship Express, running from Istanbul to Thessaloniki, stopped at the station, until service was indefinitely suspended in February 2011.

History
Uzunköprü station was opened on 4 April 1873 by the Oriental Railway as part of their main line from Istanbul to Sofia.

Services
TCDD Taşımacılık operates a daily regional train to Istanbul from Uzunköprü.

Between July 2005 and February 2011 the Friendship Express, (an international InterCity train jointly operated by the Turkish State Railways (TCDD) and TrainOSE linking Istanbul's Sirkeci Terminal, Turkey and Thessaloniki, Greece) made scheduled stops at Uzunköprü.

References

External links
Station timetable

Railway stations in Edirne Province
Railway stations opened in 1873
1873 establishments in the Ottoman Empire
Uzunköprü District